The 2016 Duquesne Dukes football team represented Duquesne University in the 2016 NCAA Division I FCS football season. They were led by 12th-year head coach Jerry Schmitt and played their home games at Arthur J. Rooney Athletic Field. They were a member of the Northeast Conference. They finished the season 8–3, 5–1 in NEC play to finish in a tie for the conference title with Saint Francis (PA). Due to their head-to-head loss to Saint Francis (PA), they did not receive the NEC's automatic bid to the FCS Playoffs and did not receive an at-large bid.

Schedule

Source: Schedule

Game summaries

at Youngstown State

Bucknell

Dayton

Kennesaw State

at Jacksonville

Robert Morris

at Saint Francis (PA)

Bryant

at Wagner

Sacred Heart

at Central Connecticut

References

Duquesne
Duquesne Dukes football seasons
Northeast Conference football champion seasons
Duquesne Dukes football